The 2017 Texas Longhorns football team, known variously as "Texas", "UT", the "Longhorns", or the "Horns", was a collegiate American football team representing the University of Texas at Austin as a member of the Big 12 Conference in the 2017 NCAA Division I FBS football season; the 2017 team was the 125th to represent the university in college football. The Longhorns were led by first-year head coach Tom Herman with Tim Beck as the team's offensive coordinator and Todd Orlando as the team's defensive coordinator. The team played its home games at Darrell K Royal–Texas Memorial Stadium in Austin, Texas.

Following a 5–7 season the previous year, the 2017 preseason involved a complete overhaul of the coaching staff for the Texas Longhorns football team. On November 27, 2016, Houston head coach Tom Herman was hired as the Longhorns head coach, replacing Charlie Strong.

Recruiting

Position key

Recruits

Texas signed a total of 18 recruits.

Personnel
An entire staff needed to be built as Coach Herman chose not to retain any current staff members that were under Coach Strong. The initial group of 6 that followed Herman from Houston to Texas included four assistant coaches, all of whom have extensive coaching experience in the state of Texas with three being Texas natives. Former Longhorn great Oscar Giles, Corby Meekins, Derek Warehime and Jason Washington all were coaches on Herman's Houston staff and will join him in Austin. Positions and titles for the assistant coaches will be announced after the completion of the staff. In addition, Fernando Lovo will serve as Assistant AD for Football Operations, while Derek Chang will be Director of Player Personnel. Both also come from Herman's UH staff.

Texas then added another former Herman UH assistant, the one year offensive coordinator from Rutgers Drew Mehringer as the passing game coordinator. 4 more pieces of the puzzle then were announced on Dec 19, more from his Houston staff. Todd Orlando, who was Hermans Defensive Coorindator at Houston comes over in the same role. Assistant Coach Craig Naviar also joins him. Additionally, Yancy McKnight will serve as Head Strength and Conditioning Coach for Football, while Tory Teykl will be Director of Football Operations. Herman also added the recently retired NFL player and former Longhorn Michael Huff as a quality control/assistant DB coach.

Roster and coaching staff

Schedule

Media affiliates
Texas' flagship radio station is KTXX-FM ("The Horn", 104.9 FM) based in Austin, Texas. Fourteen other FM stations and twenty-one AM stations cover UT's football games around Texas, while a pair of FM and AM stations based in Austin cover Texas games in Spanish. Texas Longhorns football games are broadcast via satellite radio on Sirius channel 117, XM channel 202, and SiriusXM channel 969.

Rankings

References

Texas
Texas Longhorns football seasons
Texas Bowl champion seasons
Texas Longhorns football